A subsatellite, also known as a submoon, or moonmoon, is a "moon of a moon" or a hypothetical natural satellite that orbits the moon of a planet.

It is inferred from the empirical study of natural satellites in the Solar System that subsatellites may be rare, albeit possible, elements of planetary systems. In the Solar System, the giant planets have large collections of natural satellites. The majority of detected exoplanets are giant planets; at least one, Kepler-1625b, may have a very large exomoon, named Kepler-1625b I, which could theoretically host a subsatellite. Nonetheless, aside from human-launched satellites in temporary lunar orbit, no notable subsatellite is known in the Solar System or beyond. In most cases, the tidal effects of the planet would make such a system unstable.

Terminology
Terms used in scientific literature for subsatellites include "submoons" and "moon-moons". Colloquial terms that have been suggested include moonitos, moonettes, and moooons.

Possible natural instances

Rhea 

The possible detection of a ring system around Saturn's natural satellite Rhea led to calculations that indicated that satellites orbiting Rhea would have stable orbits. The rings suspected were thought to be narrow, a phenomenon normally associated with shepherd moons; however, targeted images taken by the Cassini spacecraft failed to detect any subsatellites or rings associated with Rhea, at least no particles larger than a few millimeters.

Iapetus
It has also been proposed that Saturn's satellite Iapetus possessed a subsatellite in the past; this is one of several hypotheses that have been put forward to account for its unusual equatorial ridge. An ancient giant impact on Iapetus could have produced a subsatellite; as Saturn despun Iapetus, the subsatellite's orbit would then decay until it crossed Iapetus' Roche limit, forming a transient ring which then impacted Iapetus to form a ridge. Such a scenario could have happened on the other giant-planet satellites as well, but only for Iapetus and perhaps Oberon would the resulting ridge have formed after the Late Heavy Bombardment and thus survived to the present day.

Irregular moons of Saturn
Light-curve analysis suggests that Saturn's irregular satellite Kiviuq is extremely prolate, and is likely a contact binary or even a binary moon. Other candidates among the Saturnian irregulars include Bestla, Erriapus, and Bebhionn.

Artificial subsatellites

Historical
Many spacecraft have orbited the Moon, including crewed craft of the Apollo program. , none have orbited any other moons. In 1988, the Soviet Union unsuccessfully attempted to put two robotic probes on quasi-orbits around the Martian moon Phobos.

Current

Launched June 18, 2009, the Lunar Reconnaissance Orbiter (LRO) is a NASA robotic spacecraft currently orbiting the Moon in an eccentric polar mapping orbit. Data collected by LRO have been described as essential for planning NASA's future human and robotic missions to the Moon. Its detailed mapping program is identifying safe landing sites, locating potential resources on the Moon, characterizing the radiation environment, and demonstrating new technologies.

CAPSTONE is a project launched in June 2022. Composed of a 12-unit collection of CubeSats which spent a few months in transit to the moon to arrive in November 2022. It will spend about 9 months in the moons near rectilinear halo orbit.  CAPSTONE is intended to test and verify the viability of the planned NRHO of planned future Lunar Gateway and its communication efficiency.

Future planned artificial moon satellites
Launched on 11 December 2022, the Lunar Flashlight is a low-cost CubeSat lunar orbiter mission to explore, locate, and estimate size and composition of water ice deposits on the Moon for future exploitation by robots or humans from a polar orbit. As of December 2022, Lunar Flashlight is en route to the Moon.

The interplanetary spacecraft JUICE currently in development will enter an orbit around Ganymede in 2032, becoming the first spacecraft to orbit a moon other than Earth's.

Additionally, the multi-agency supported Lunar Gateway human-rated space station is due to begin construction in 2024 in a near-rectilinear halo orbit (NRHO), primarily in support of the later stage NASA Artemis program missions to Earth's moon.  Lunar Gateway will also potentially support future missions to Mars and outlying asteroids.

In fiction
 In Planet 51, the titular planet is orbited by a moon with a Saturn-like ring system.
 Dumb Martian, a short story by John Wyndham, mostly takes place on Jupiter IV/II, a sub-moon of Callisto (see The Seeds of Time).
 In Star Wars, the moon Ajan Kloss has two moons of its own.

See also

 Binary asteroid
 
 Minor-planet moon
 Moons of Jupiter
 Moons of Neptune
 Moons of Saturn
 Moons of Uranus
 Satellite system (astronomy)

References

External links 
 
 Shadow Moons: The Unknown Sub-Worlds that Might Harbor Life
 Likely First Photo of Planet Beyond the Solar System
 Working Group on Extrasolar Planets – Definition of a "Planet" Position statement on the definition of a planet. (IAU)
 The Hunt for Exomoons with Kepler (HEK): I. Description of a New Observational Project

Moons
Hypothetical moons